The Radiolarian Series is an album project by experimental jazz fusion trio Medeski Martin & Wood released in three installments in 2008–2009.

Background 
In early 2008 the band announced on their official website: "Medeski Martin & Wood are planning three tours, plus three albums in 2008. Each tour and subsequent album will consist of all NEW MUSIC. The plan: Write > Tour > Record > Repeat."

"The problem with us," keyboardist John Medeski explains, "is that when we record an album, by the time a record company gets it out, we’ve already been playing the music for six or eight months, and we’re ready to move on."

The three volumes of The Radiolarian Series were first released as three separate albums. The series was also released as a 5-CD box set in 2009.

The Radiolarian Series takes its name from radiolarians (also radiolaria), amoeboid protozoa that produce intricate mineral skeletons, typically with a central capsule dividing the cell into inner and outer portions, called endoplasm and ectoplasm.

Radiolaria grow their intricately beautiful patterned skeleton around their soft core in defiance of normal biological process. This is, according to the band, "similar to Medeski Martin and Wood's latest creative cycle."

The Radiolarian Series consists of music composed and developed over the course of the band's three-part 2008 "Viva la Evolution" Tour:

 Part One: February 19–29 (Northeast U.S.)
 Part Two: July 11–18 (Southeast U.S.)
 Part Three: November 12–22 (Pacific Northwest (U.S. & Canada))

Track listing
All tracks by Medeski Martin & Wood unless otherwise noted.

RADIOLARIANS 1:
First Light
Cloud Wars
Muchas Gracias
Professor Nohair
Reliquary
Free Go Lily (traditional)
Rolling Son
Sweet Pea Dreams
God Fire
Hidden Moon

RADIOLARIANS 2:

Flat Tires  
Junkyard  
Padirecto  
ijiji  
Riffin' Ed  
Amber Gris  
Chasen vs Suribachi  
Dollar Pants  
Amish Pinxtos  
Baby, Let Me Follow You Down (traditional)

RADIOLARIANS 3:

Chantes des Femmes
Satan Your Kingdom Must Come Down (traditional)
Kota
Undone
Wonton
Walk Back
Jean's Scene
Broken Mirror
Gwyra Mi

Radiolarians Box Set

The 2009 box set included the original three discs, plus a full-length DVD, a live disc, a remix disc, and two vinyl records.

Performers
John Medeski – keyboards
Billy Martin – drums, percussion
Chris Wood – basses

Credits

Produced by Medeski Martin & Wood
Recorded at Shackston Studio, Kingston, NY 
Mixed at Synergy Recording, Kingston NY
Recorded & Mixed by David Kent, Assisted by Jed Kosiner
Mastered by Alan Silverman, Arf Mastering
Management by Liz Penta, Emcee Artist Management

References

External links
RFC Interview with MMW's Chris Wood | Extended Version - November 2009 Interview with bassist Chris Wood 
MMW and the Power of Creation - September 2009 Interview with drummer Billy Martin about Radiolarians
Citizen Dick Interview - August 2009 Interview with drummer Billy Martin about Radiolarians
PopMatters Reviews of Radiolarians 2 and Radiolarians 3 - at PopMatters.com

Medeski Martin & Wood albums
Avant-garde jazz albums
2008 albums
2009 albums
Album series
Indirecto Records albums
Indirecto Records compilation albums
Indirecto Records video albums
Indirecto Records live albums
2009 live albums
Medeski Martin & Wood live albums
Medeski Martin & Wood video albums
Live avant-garde jazz albums